Red Machine or The Red Machine may refer to:

 The Red Machine, a nickname of the former Soviet Union national ice hockey team.
 Red Machine: Reloaded, a nickname of the Russian national ice hockey team
 Big Red Machine, a nickname of the Major League Baseball team, the Cincinnati Reds
 Into the Grizzly Maze (originally titled Red Machine), an American action horror-thriller film
 The Red Machine of Pori (Porin Punakone) a nickname for Porin Ässät.